Lagercrantz is the name of an influential Swedish noble family, whose members held various positions in Sweden and Finland.

History 
On 13 February 1682 he family was ennobled with the name Lagercrantz. On 6 October 1682 the family was introduced to the House of Nobility. The current head of the family is Carl Lagercrantz (born 1935).

Notable members 
 Bengt Lagercrantz (1887–1924), Swedish sport shooter
 Bror Lagercrantz (1894–1981), Swedish fencer
 David Lagercrantz (born 1962), Swedish journalist and author
 Eliel Lagercrantz (1894–1973), Finnish linguist
 Marika Lagercrantz (born 1954), Swedish actress
 Olof Lagercrantz (1911–2002), Swedish writer and critic
 Rose Lagercrantz (born 1947), Swedish author